Christopher Trotter (born August 1967, in Brisbane, Queensland), is an Australian sculptor who makes sculptures from discarded scrap material.

Trotter, who attends the Queensland University of Technology, has been creating artworks for government, councils, universities and developers since 1994. His sculptures, each of which is unique, include the City Roos in George Street, Brisbane.

See also
List of public art in Brisbane

References 
 Christopher Trotter biography – Art and Soul Gallery
 Christopher Trotter and his sculptures
 Christopher Trotter and his artwork

External links 
 Christopher Trotter's official website – Artist statement
 Christopher Trotter's official website – City Roos
 Christopher Trotter's official website – Public Works List
 Scrap Metal Kangaroos
 Christopher Trotter – Arts and culture 
 Christopher Trotter and others  – Collection highlights, Ipswich Art Gallery, Queensland

21st-century Australian sculptors
People from Brisbane
1967 births
Living people
Queensland University of Technology alumni